Dimas Ezequiel Morales (born 22 June 1994) is an Argentine professional footballer who plays as a left-back.

Career
San Lorenzo were Morales' first club, though he soon joined Atlético de Rafaela. He made his senior bow in a Copa Argentina round of sixteen tie with San Lorenzo in June 2013, appearing for the full ninety minutes of a 0–3 loss. His Primera División debut arrived on 8 August against Lanús, which was the second of twelve total appearances for the club. In his time with Atlético de Rafaela, Morales was loaned to Santamarina and Ferro Carril Oeste; he didn't feature competitively for Santamarina, though did participate six times for Ferro Carril Oeste. Regional team Club Atletico Nación signed Morales in 2017.

June 2018 saw Morales, coming off a stint with San Lorenzo Mar del Plata, join Los Andes. His first appearance came in a loss to Independiente Rivadavia on 25 August. He was released in June 2020.

On 15 October 2020, Morales moved to Uruguayan club Sud América.

Career statistics
.

References

External links

1994 births
Living people
Sportspeople from Mar del Plata
Argentine footballers
Argentine expatriate footballers
Association football defenders
Argentine Primera División players
Primera Nacional players
Primera B Metropolitana players
Uruguayan Segunda División players
Atlético de Rafaela footballers
Club y Biblioteca Ramón Santamarina footballers
Ferro Carril Oeste footballers
Club Atlético Los Andes footballers
Sud América players
Argentine expatriate sportspeople in Uruguay
Expatriate footballers in Uruguay